Hardwar Gap is a natural gap located in the Blue Mountains, on the border between Saint Andrew Parish and Portland Parish.

References

Blue Mountains (Jamaica)